The list is a list of television channels and stations in the Arab World, as well as Arab-based Western television channels. The majority, if not all, of these channels, are chiefly in Arabic.

Middle East
Almayadeen Media Network
Al-mayadeen
Mayadeen
Almayadeen Tv

Africa

Algeria

Current channels
 EPTV
 Canal Algérie
 A3
 Channel 4
 Coran TV
 TV 6
 TV7 ELMAARIFA
 TV8 EDHAKIRA
 TV9 Barlamania
 AL24 News
 Al Anis
 Algerian 4Kids
 Amou Yazid Tofola
 Bahia TV
 Beur TV
 Echorouk TV
 Echorouk News
 El Adjwaa TV
 El Bilad TV
 El Fadjer TV
 El Hayat TV
 El Heddaf TV
 Ennahar TV
 Nedjma TV
 Salam TV
 Samira TV
 Watania TV
 Zahra TV

Former channels
 Alasr TV
 Al Makam
 Atlas TV
 DTV Cinéma
 El Djazairia One
 El Watan DZ
 ESS TV
 Jil TV
 Lina TV
 L'Index TV
 Wiam TV

Chad

 Télé Tchad

Djibouti

 Radio Television of Djibouti

Egypt
 Rotana Masriya
 Rotana Cinema
 Rotana Aflam
 Rotana Khalaijia
 Rotana Drama
 Rotana Clip
 Rotana Classic
 Rotana Mousica
 Rotana Kids
 Rotana Comedy
 Mekameleen TV
 Misr El Balad
 Misr El Balad 2
 Al Masriya
 Dream TV
 El Mehwar
 El Mehwar 2
 El Mehwar Drama
 CBC
 CBC Two
 CBC Drama
 CBC + 2
 CBC Sofra
 CBC Extra
 Al Hayat 1
 Al Hayat 2
 Al Hayat Cinema
 Al Hayat Series
 Al Hayat Sports
 Al Hayat Al Ann
 Al Hayat We Alnas
 Al Nahar TV
 Al Nahar + 2 
 Al Nahar Noor
 Al Nahar Al Youm
 MBC Masr
 Al Nahar Sports
 Al Nahar Drama
 Al Nahar Cinema
 Al Masria 1
 Al Maria 2
 ART Aflam 1
 ART Aflam 2
 ART Hekayat 1
 ART Hekayat 2
 ART Cinema
 ART Hekayat Kaman
 ART America
 ART Movies
 ART Sport
 ART Sport 2
 ART Sport 3
 ART Sport 4
 ART Sport 5
 ART Sport 6
 ART Sport 7
 ART Sport 8
 ART Sport 9
 ART Movie World
 ART Prime Sport
 ART Variety
 ART Cable
 ART Music Radio
 ART Tarab
 ART Latino
 ART Variety Australia
 ART Cima
Nickelodeon
Nick Jr.
Nicktoons
 Nile Drama
 Nile Drama 2
 Nile Cinema
 Nile Comedy
 Nile Culture
 Nile News
 Nile Educational
 Nile Family
 Nile Life
 Nile Sport
 Cairo Cinema
 Cairo Cinema 2
 Cairo Drama
 Cairo Comedy
 Cairo Film
 Cairo Fight
 Cairo Zaman
 Panorama Film
 Panorama Action
 Panorama Drama
 Panorama Drama 2
 Panorama Comedy
 Star Cinema 1
 Star Cinema 2
 Star Cinema 3
 Star Aflam
 Al Aan TV
 El Mehwar Channel
 Masr Alhayah
 Iqraa EGY
 Sama Cinema
 Nile TV
 Koky Kids
 Cima
 DMC
 DMC Drama
 DMC Sports
 TEN TV
 ON E
 ON Sport
 ON Sport 2
 ON Drama
 Al Yawm
 Al Safawa
 NBN
 Ertu 1
 Ertu 2
 Aghapy TV
 MBC
 MBC 2
 MBC 3
 MBC 4
 MBC Action
 MBC Bollywood
 MBC Drama
 MBC FM
 MBC Masr 2
 MBC Max
 MBC Plus Drama
 Hi TV
 Al Mahaba TV
 Al Nada TV
 Time Cinema
 Time Cinema 2
 Time Comedy
 Time Comedy 2
 Time Drama
 Time Drama 2
 Time Quran
 Time Sport
 Time Taxi
 Time Film
 Play Hekayat
 Panorama TV
 Panorama Drama
 Panorama Drama 2
 Panorama Film
 Panorama Action
 Panorama Food
 Apple Aflam
 Apple Cinema
 Apple Comedy
 Apple Hekayat
 Apple Mosalsalat
 Apple Drama
 Apple Today
 LTC Egypt
 Alfa Cinema 1
 Alfa Cinema 2
 Alfa Series HD
 Alfa Series HD +2
 Alfa Al Yawm
 Alfa Al Safwa
 Fann TV
 Cinema Pro
 Family Drama
 Darbaka Aflam
 Darbaka Cinema
 Darbaka Drama
 Darbaka Action
 El Tohamy
 Moga Comedy TV
 Top Movies
 BBC Arabic
 B4U Aflam
 OrPit Plus Drama
 OrPit Plus Hekayat
 OrPit Plus Al Youm
 OrPit Plus Cinema
 OrPit Plus Movies
 Sada El Balad
 Sada El Balad 2
 Sada El Balad Drama
 Al Ghad Al Araby
 Free TV
 Mazzika
 Mazazikh
 Maspero Zaman
 Daawah TV
 Nogoum FM TV
 Tok Tok Cima
 Tok Tok Cinema
 Tok Tok Aflam
 Tok Tok Drama
 Tok Tok Mosalslat
 Tok Tok Classic
 Set El Bet
 Abu Dhabi Drama
 Abu Dhabi Sport
 Abu Dhabi TV
 Bein Drama
 Bein Movies
 OSN Ya Hala
 OSN Ya Hala Cinema
 OSN Ya Hala Drama
 OSN Ya Hala Drama 2
 OSN Ya Hala Al Oula
 OSN News
 OSN Sport
 OSN Movies
 Ahrar 25
 Belody Aflam
 Misr Al Aan TV
 Nile News
 Al Quran Al Karim
 Aljazeera
 Aljazeera Mubasher
 Sat 7 Arabic
 Sat 7 Kids
 Fox Cinema
 Fox Classic
 Al Shasha TV
 Al Shasha Food
 Al Shasha Drama
 Al Shasha Cinema
 Al Shasha Hekayat
 Al Shasha Classic
 Al Shasha Comedy
 Al Shasha Mosalslata
 Al Shasha Film
 El Sharq
 El Sharq El Awast
 Mix Hollywood
 Mix bel Araby 
 Showtime Comedy
 Showtime Cinema
 Showtime Aflam
 Showtime Drama
 Showtime Mosalslat
 Showtime Film
 Shababik Mosalslat
 Shababik Drama
 Shababik Cinema
 Shababik Hekayat
 Shababik Aflam
 Shababik Classic
 M Drama
 M Cinema
 M Aflam
 M Classic
 Home Aflam
 Home Cinema
 Home Drama
 Masr Cinema
 Masr Aflam
 Masr Drama
 Click Aflam
 Click Cinema
 Van Drama
 Van Hekayat
 Van Mosalsalat
 Cartoon Network Arabic
 Taxi TV
 ONTV
 Zee Aflam
 Zee Alwan
 Zee Masr
 Time Sports
 Watan TV
 Azhari TV
 IUC TV
 Al Madeeh
 Oscar TV
 Fox Masr
 Fatafeat
 4Shbab
 Zilzal Aflam
 Zilzal Al Youm
 Zilzal Cinema
 Zilzal Classic
 Zilzal Drama
 Zilzal Mosalsalat
 Al Deeb Drama
 Al Deeb Aflam

Eritrea

Eri-TV
ERI TV Series Channel
ERI TV Sports

Ethiopia
Ethiopian Television 2
ETV Ethiopia

Libya

218TV
Libya's Channel TV
Libya Awalan
Libya International TV
Libya Alhadath TV
Libya 24
Libyan Business TV
Libya Al Ahrar
Libya One TV
Libya Al Riadhiya
Alnabaa TV
Tanasuh TV
Arraed TV
Fezzan TV
Misrata TV
Aljamahiriya TV

Mauritania
TV de Mauritanie
Mauritanie Series Channel

Morocco

Somalia
sntv
Universal TV
ETN TV
SBC TV
Somali Channel
Shabelle TV
Horn Cable TV
Somaliland National Television
RTN

South Africa
Deen TV

South Sudan

South Sudan Television
Ebony TV

Sudan

Sudan 

Blue Nile 

Khartoum 

Omdurman 

Sudan 24

Al Nielsen 

Sudan Music

Al Shamalia TV

Tunisia
 Tunisia Nat 1
 Tunisia Nat 2
 Attesiaa TV
 El Hiwar El Tounousi
 Tunisna
 Carthage +
 Al Janoubia TV
 Al Insan TV
 Nessma TV
 Zaytouna TV
 Hannibal TV
 Telvza TV

Europe

France

France 24 Arabic
TV5MONDE Maghreb-Orient (subtitles only)

Germany

DW Arabia

Russia
RT Arabic

United Kingdom

Al Araby
BBC Arabic
MTA 3
Quest Arabiya
Sky News Arabia

Americas

Canada
YallatalkTv

United States

Current channels
Alhurra
CNBC Arabiya
Fox
Fox Movies
National Geographic Abu Dhabi
Nat Geo Kids Abu Dhabi
The Arabic Channel
 Rotana America
 Aleppo Today

Asia

Bahrain

 Bahrain TV

China
CGTN Arabic

Iran
Al-Ahvaz TV
Al Ahwaz TV
Ahwazna TV
Al-Alam News Network
Al-Kawthar TV
iFilm Arabic

Iraq

Palestine

KAN 33
i24news Arabic
Al-Aqsa TV
Palestinian Satellite Channel

Former channels
Channel 33

Jordan

 Roya TV
 Roya Drama
 Roya Comedy
 Roya News
 Roya Kids
 Roya Sports
 Roya Kitchen
 Jordan TV
 Jordan Sport TV
 JoSat
 Amman TV
 Al-Mamlaka TV
 M6 Jordan
 W9 Jordan
 6ter Jordan
 M6 Music Jordan
ON Jordan
ON Food
ON Sport Jordan
ON Sport 2 Jordan
Ordoni TV
Jordan Channel 1
Jordan Channel 2
Jordan Channel 3 
Jordan Channel 4
Jordan Channel 5
Al Farah TV
Amman Channel
Irbid Channel
Zarqa Channel
Ajloun Channel
Al Karak Channel
Maan Channel
Tafilah Channel
Mafraq Channel
Aqaba Channel
Al Salt Channel
Al-Faisaly TV
Al-Wehdat TV
Al Dar Jordan
Al Ghad TV
Al Ghad Sports
 Norman TV
 Amman Today TV

Kuwait

Lebanon
Current Channels:
Télé Liban
Télé Lumière
MTV Lebanon
One
OTV
LDC
LBC International
LBC Europe
LBC Sat
LBC Drama
LBC America
LDC TV
LBC Drama
Future TV
Future TV USA
Nagham
Arab Woman TV
NBN
ANB
Aghani TV
Hawacom
Al Mayadeen
Al Manar
Al Jadeed
Almayadeen Media Network
Former Channels:
 Kilikia
 ICN
 Mashrek
 Antenne Plus
 CVN
 733
 Future News
 Star Academy 7/24

Oman

Palestine

Al-Quds Educational Channel QOU
Al-Aqsa TV
Palestinian Satellite Channel
Palestinian Series Channel
Palestinian Flash Channel
Qalara Harbor Channel
Al Khair Al Khaleej Channel
Al Quds Al-Yawm
Palestine Today

Saudi Arabia

Saudi Arabia
 OSN (Pay Television) 
 Rotana Channels
 MBC
 MBC 2
 MBC 3
 MBC 4
 MBC Action
 MBC Bollywood
 MBC Drama
 MBC FM
 MBC Masr 2
 MBC Max
 SBC
 Al Arabiya
 Saudi Quran
 Iqraa
 Saudi TV
 Fajer TV West Bank 1
 Sana TV
 Nabaa TV
 Saudi Ajyal
 Saudi TV 2
 SA Family
 Ajyal Saudi TV
 Iqraa Africa-Europe
 Selah TV
 Seevii Drama
 Seevii Alola
 Nilat TV
 Daleel TV
 Al Mergab 2
 Selevison HEVC 4K
 Salman Alodah TV
 Amasi TV
 Burhan TV
 Al Waka'a
 Al Teeb TV
 Saudi Primary
 Saudi Intermediate
 Saudi Secondary
 Quran Hidayah
 Kaifa TV
 Torath
 Jawan
 Zad TV
 Saudi Sports
 Al Resalah Satellite Channel
 Resalat Al Islam
 Direct
 IEN TV
 Hajj 1436
 SA News
 Al Oprah TV
 Prombed TV
 Al Majd TV
 Semsem TV
 SA 24
 Al Fursan TV
 Eyaka Nabod
 Ayaat
 Mecca TV
 Ajyal Saudi TV
 Iqraa Alkhair
 Al Oscar TV
 Al Anbar TV
 Al Khalej
 Al Mydan
 D1 Jeddah
 Al Amaken Drama
 22 TV
 Al Adel
 KSA Vision 2030
 Weasl
 Nickeloden Arabia
 Cartoon Network Arabic
 Disney Channel Arabia
 Al Fursan TV
 Khaled Alrashed Video
 Al Ma3ali Maali TV
 Al Maja Islamic Science
 Hajj 1436
 Al Ikbariya
 Saudi Sunna
 Al Saha TV
 Al Saha TV 2
 Al Saha TV 3
 Al Resalah TV
 Hail TV
 Wisal Hausa TV
 Burhan TV
 Al Soyoof
 Al Hajj 2016
 Alhurra TV
 Al Danah
 Al Hajj 2017
 Saudi Al Haj
 Seevii Aflam
 Seevii TV
 Seevii Prime 1
 Seevii Prime 2
 Seevii Prime 3
 Seevii Shamiya
 Seevii Ramadan
 Seevii Be Link
 Seevii Showcase
 Seevii Kharabeesh
 Romooz TV
 Aali TV
 Saudi Radio Neda
 B4U Aflam
 SA 24 Sport
 Masdar TV
 Shahamh TV
 Cordoba Internacional
 Seevii Documentary
 Al Majd Islamic Hadeeth
 IEN Doros TV
 Bin Othaimeen TV
 Oyoon Alwatan
 Quraanka Hidaaya
 Quran Hedayah Indonesia
 Quran Hedayah Tagalog
 Quran Hidayah Aboringines
 Quran Hidayah Amazigh
 Quran Hidayah Amharic
 IEN Doros 1
 IEN Doros 2
 IEN Doros 3
 IEN Doros 4
 IEN Doros 5
 IEN Doros 6
 IEN Doros 7
 IEN Doros 8
 IEN Doros 9
 KSA Cooking
 EN TV
 KSA Kids
 Quran Hidayah Bengal
 Quran Hidayah Chinese
 Quran Hidayah English
 Quran Hidayah Hindi
 Quran Hidayah Persian
 Quran Hidayah Sindhi
 Quran Hidayah Sinhala
 Quran Hidayah Urdu
 Qurani Hidayah
 Beity TV
 Quran Channel
 Smart TV
 Rotana Cinema KSA
 Zee KSA
 Al Oprah TV
 Al Khobar Flash Channel

Syria
 Syria Television (On DVB-T System)
 Syria Drama
 Syrian News Channel (Syria Al Ekhbaria) (On DVB-T System)
 Nour Al Sham
 Syrian education TV (On DVB-T System)
 Sakaker 24 (On DVB-T System)
 Drama 24 (On DVB-T System)
 Sports TV (On DVB-T System)
 Syria TV SD
 Syria TV HD
Lana TV
Lana TV HD
Lana Plus TV
Orient News
Halab Today TV
PubliTools
Sama TV
Al khabar TV
Massaya TV
Suroyo TV

Qatar
 Qatar TV
 Qatar TV HD
 Al Jazeera 
 Al Jazeera Mubasher
 Al Jazeera English
 Al Jazeera Documentary
 Al Rayyan 
 Al Rayyan HD
 Al Rayyan Al Qadim HD
 Qatar Today
 beIN SPORTS
 beIN SPORTS News
 beIN SPORTS 1
 beIN SPORTS 2
 beIN SPORTS 3
 beIN SPORTS 4
 beIN SPORTS 5
 beIN SPORTS 6
 beIN SPORTS 7
 beIN SPORTS PREMIUM 1
 beIN SPORTS PREMIUM 2
 beIN SPORTS PREMIUM 3
 beIN SPORTS XTRA 1
 beIN SPORTS XTRA 2
 beIN SPORTS AFC
 beIN SPORTS AFC 1
 beIN SPORTS AFC 2
 beIN SPORTS AFC 3
 beIN SPORTS AFC 4
 beIN SPORTS MAX 1
 beIN SPORTS MAX 2
 beIN SPORTS MAX 3
 beIN SPORTS MAX 4
 beIN SPORTS MAX 5
 beIN SPORTS MAX 6
 beIN 4K
 Al Araby TV 
 Al Araby TV HD
 Al Araby 2 TV
 Alkass one
 Alkass two
 Alkass three
 Alkass four
 Alkass five
 Alkass six
 Alkass seven
 Alkass eight

Turkey
TRT Al Arabiya

United Arab Emirates

 Abu Dhabi TV
 Drama (MENA TV channel)
 Quest Arabiya
 Dubai TV
 FOX Ruwayat
 Zee Alwan
 Zee Aflam
 MBC 5
 MBC 2 (Middle East and North Africa)
 MBC 3
 MBC 4
 MBC Action
 MBC Drama (Middle East and North Africa)
 MBC Max
 MBC Bollywood
 FOX
 FOX Movies
 Spacetoon
 Wanasah
 Dubai Drama
 Dubai Sport 1
 Dubai Sport 2
 Dubai One
 Al Aan TV
 Hala TV
 Al Sabeeha TV

Yemen

 Yemen TV

References

Arabic

Television channels